Celebration was a 1970s American rock band, fronted by Beach Boys lead singer Mike Love as well as members of the band King Harvest. Celebration released three albums before they broke up in 1979.

Background
During the late 1970s, Beach Boys frontman Mike Love began to work on outside projects.  His first major work was with a new band, Celebration. The band featured members of the short lived band King Harvest as well as future and current Beach Boys live backing members. The band's first project was a soundtrack for the film Almost Summer, which featured the lead single of the same name written by Love and his Beach Boys band mates Al Jardine and Brian Wilson. The song reached No.28 on the Billboard Hot 100 in 1978. The band followed up the album with two more albums, one of original material and another of disco numbers. Despite several live appearances and some success, the band disbanded in 1979; however some members of the group continued to perform with Mike Love in the Beach Boys backing band.

Members
Almost Summer album:
 Mike Love - lead vocals
 Charles Lloyd - saxophone, flute
 Ron Altbach - keyboards 
 Dave "Doc" Robinson - bass, backing vocals
 Paul Fauerso - keyboards, backing vocals
 Ed Carter - guitar 
 Wells Kelly - bass 
 Gary Griffin - keyboards
Additional musicians:
 Steve Douglas - sax
 Rusty Ford - bass
 Tom Smith - drums
 Sterling Smith - synthesizers
 Ed Tuleja - guitars
 Dave Bunch - guitars
 Maureen Love - harp

Celebration album:
 Mike Love - lead vocals
 Dave "Doc" Robinson - backing vocals 
 Ron Altbach - keyboards 
 Charles Lloyd - saxophone
 Paul Fauerso - keyboards, backing vocals
 Tim Weston - guitar
 Kevin Brandon - bass
 Kim Calkins - drums

Discography

Albums
 1978: Almost Summer: Music from the Original Motion Picture Score (MCA Records)
 1978: Celebration (Pacific Arts Records)
 1979: Disco Celebration (ADC Records)

Singles 
 1978: "Almost Summer" - # 28 on Billboard Hot 100; # 30 on RPM Top 100
 1978: "It’s O.K." 
 1978: "Summer in the City"/"Island Girl" 
 1979: "Country Pie"/"Gettin’ Hungry" 
 1979: "Starbaby"/"Gettin’ Hungry"

References

External Links
 

MCA Records artists
American pop rock music groups
Mike Love